Arthur Waugh (27 August 1866  – 26 June 1943) was an English author, literary critic and publisher. He was the father of the authors Alec Waugh and Evelyn Waugh.

Early life
Waugh was born in Midsomer Norton, Somerset, in 1866, elder son of prosperous country physician Alexander Waugh (1840-1906), who bullied his wife and children and became known in the Waugh family as "the Brute", and Annie (née Morgan), of a strict Plymouth Brethren background. Waugh's mother Annie was a second cousin of Edmund Gosse, her mother, Anne, being first cousin of the naturalist Philip Henry Gosse. His great-grandfather Rev. Alexander Waugh (1754–1827) was a minister in the Secession Church of Scotland who helped found the London Missionary Society and was one of the leading Nonconformist preachers of his day.

He was educated at Sherborne School, Sherborne, Dorset, and New College, Oxford, where he won the Newdigate Prize for Poetry for a ballad on the subject of Gordon of Khartoum in 1888.

Career
In 1892, he wrote the first biography of the poet Alfred Tennyson, which was published by William Heineman.  In 1894, he contributed to the first issue of the magazine The Yellow Book. In 1899 he wrote the rhymes for a children's book with illustrations by William Nicholson. In 1900 Waugh wrote and published Robert Browning, a brief biography of the author of the same name. He was also a regular correspondent for the magazine The New York Critic, and from 1906 to 1931, he was a literary critic for the London newspaper The Daily Telegraph.

His published works include poetry, biographies, literary criticism, and an autobiography, titled One Man's Road, published in 1931.

From 1902 to 1930, he was the Managing Director and Chairman of the publishing house Chapman and Hall, about which he wrote a detailed history titled A Hundred Years in Publishing in 1930.

Personal life
In 1893, Waugh was married to Catherine Charlotte "Kate" Raban (1870–1954), a great-granddaughter of Lord Cockburn (1779–1854). Together, they were the parents of two sons:

 Alexander Raban Waugh (1898–1981), a novelist who married three times.
 Arthur Evelyn St. John Waugh (1903–1966), a novelist who married twice.

He died at his home in Highgate, in greater London, England, on 26 June 1943. Fourteen volumes of his diaries covering the period of 1930 to his death are held in the Boston University Library.

Bibliography
One Man's Road: being a Picture of Life in a Passing Generation by Arthur Waugh, 1931.
My Father: Arthur Waugh in "The Early Years of Alec Waugh" by Alec Waugh, 1962.
Fathers and Sons: The Autobiography of a Family by Alexander Waugh, 2004.

References

External links

 
 
 
 
 The Square Book of Animals From the Collections at the Library of Congress

1866 births
1943 deaths
Alumni of New College, Oxford
English writers
People educated at Sherborne School
People from Midsomer Norton
Arthur